Certain Women may refer to:

 Certain Women (TV series), a 1970s Australian television series
 Certain Women (film), a 2016 American film

See also 
 A Certain Woman, English translation of a Japanese novel by Arishima Takeo published in 1919
 That Certain Woman, a 1937 American drama film